Sonata Undine in e minor is a flute and piano sonata written by Carl Reinecke that is based on the novel Undine by Friedrich de la Motte Fouqué. It is his opus 167, first published in 1882.

This sonata is normally associated with the Romantic genre.  It consists of four movements.

 Allegro
 Intermezzo. Allegretto vivace
 Andante tranquillo
 Finale. Allegro molto agitato ed appassionato, quasi Presto.

Reference

See also
Ondine (mythology)
Gaspard de la nuit

External links

Performance of Sonata Undine by Dora Seres (flute) and Emese Mali (piano) from the Isabella Stewart Gardner Museum in MP3 format

Compositions by Carl Reinecke
1882 compositions
Reinecke
Compositions in E minor
Works based on Undine (novella)